Harold Cohen (1 May 1928 – 27 April 2016) was a British-born artist who was noted as the creator of AARON, a computer program designed to produce art autonomously. His work in the intersection of computer artificial intelligence and art attracted a great deal of attention, leading to exhibitions at many museums, including the Tate Gallery in London, and acquisitions by many others.

Early life
Cohen was born in London, the son of Polish-Russian parents, and was educated there at the Slade School of Fine Art.

Career
Cohen represented Great Britain at the Venice Biennial in 1966. Cohen moved to the United States as a visiting lecturer at the University of California, San Diego in 1968. He was later given the rank of professor and stayed at UC San Diego for nearly three decades, part of the time as chairman of the Visual Arts Department. In addition, he served as director of the Center for Research in Computing and the Arts at UC San Diego from 1992 to 1998.

Cohen taught at UC San Diego from 1968 to 1994. After his retirement from UCSD, he continued to work on AARON and produce new artwork in his studio in Encinitas, California.

In 2014, Cohen received the ACM SIGGRAPH Distinguished Artist Award for Lifetime Achievement award.

Early in 2016, Cohen started a new project with AARON called Fingerpainting for the 21st Century. In this project, Cohen used a touch screen to digitally colour and finish artworks. In previous AARON projects, images would be outputted in physical form before Cohen made alterations.

Family life
His partner was the prominent Japanese poet Hiromi Itō.

AARON
Cohen's work on AARON began in 1968 at the University of California, San Diego.
He initially wrote AARON in the C programming language but eventually converted to Lisp, citing that C was "too inflexible, too inexpressive, to deal with something as conceptually complex as color."

References

External links

 
 Harold Cohen at Victoria and Albert Museum

1928 births
2016 deaths
Artificial intelligence art
British digital artists
University of California, San Diego faculty
British contemporary artists
British people of Polish-Jewish descent